Arkadiusz Pawłowski (born 25 April 1956) is a former Polish paralympic swimmer who won fifteen medals at the Summer Paralympics.

See also
 List of multiple Paralympic gold medalists

References

External links
 

1956 births
Living people
Swimmers from Warsaw
Paralympic swimmers of Poland
Paralympic gold medalists for Poland
Paralympic silver medalists for Poland
Paralympic bronze medalists for Poland
Paralympic medalists in swimming
Swimmers at the 1980 Summer Paralympics
Swimmers at the 1984 Summer Paralympics
Swimmers at the 1988 Summer Paralympics
Swimmers at the 1992 Summer Paralympics
Swimmers at the 1996 Summer Paralympics
Swimmers at the 2000 Summer Paralympics
Medalists at the 1980 Summer Paralympics
Medalists at the 1984 Summer Paralympics
Medalists at the 1988 Summer Paralympics
Medalists at the 1992 Summer Paralympics
Medalists at the 1996 Summer Paralympics
Medalists at the 2000 Summer Paralympics
S6-classified Paralympic swimmers
Polish male freestyle swimmers
Polish male backstroke swimmers
Polish male breaststroke swimmers
Polish male butterfly swimmers
Polish male medley swimmers
20th-century Polish people